Darrius Dashone Johnson (September 17, 1972 – February 25, 2021) was an American professional football player who was a cornerback for the Denver Broncos and Kansas City Chiefs of the National Football League (NFL).

The Broncos selected Johnson out of Oklahoma in the fourth round of the 1996 draft.  Johnson played in 61 games for the Broncos from 1996 to 1999, during which he had two interceptions, both in 1998.  One of his biggest games was a 1999 playoff game against the Miami Dolphins, where Johnson had a 44-yard interception return and caused a fumble which was returned for a touchdown.  Johnson was a member of the Broncos' Super Bowl XXXII and XXXIII championship squads.  Johnson played briefly for the Kansas City Chiefs in 2003.  

Franciose Johnson wife of Darrius Johnson reported he died of sudden heart failure on February 25, 2021, and after extensive examination of the brain it was determined that Darrius Johnson died with Stage 3 CTE.

References

External links
 Stats from Database Football

1973 births
2021 deaths
People from Terrell, Texas
Players of American football from Texas
American football cornerbacks
Oklahoma Sooners football players
Denver Broncos players
Track and field athletes from Oklahoma
Kansas City Chiefs players
Place of death missing